Tortolì (or) is a town and comune in Sardinia, in the Province of Nuoro.

Geography
Tortolì is situated on the eastern coast of Sardinia. Its port and greatest hamlet is Arbatax, which has also an airport that once connected it to continental Italy and the European continent. To the north of it is Girasole and Lotzorai, to the west Villagrande Strisaili and Ilbono, and to the south Barisardo.  To the east of the town is the Mediterranean Sea.

History

Ancient history
The area of Tortolì was inhabited since the Neolithic and then frequented by the Phoenicians, Romans, Vandals, and the Byzantines.  It was part of the giudicato of Cagliari between the 10th and 13th centuries.

During the Spanish period the town was the head of the County of Quirra.

Modern history
In 1807 Tortolì became head of a province consisting of 27 villages, but in 1921 lost the capital status in favour of Lanusei. In 1859 it was  incorporated into the Province of Cagliari. In 1926 it was  incorporated into the province of Nuoro.

In 1943 the port of Arbatax was bombed, killing 13 people.

References

External links

Cities and towns in Sardinia